Richard Powell may refer to:

Dick Powell (1904–1963), American singer, actor, producer, and director
Dick Powell (American football) (1904–1986), American football player
Richard P. Powell (1908–1999), American author
Richard M. Powell (screenwriter) (1916–1996), American screenwriter
Richard M. Powell (investor) (born 1979), Jamaican investor
Richard Powell (rugby union) (1864–1944), Welsh rugby union player
Richard Powell (athlete) (born c. 1971), known as Richie, British wheelchair athlete
Richard Powell (rower) (born 1960), Australian Olympic rower
Richie Powell (1931–1956), American jazz pianist
Richard C. Powell (born 1939), president of the Optical Society of America in 2000
Sir Richard Powell, 1st Baronet (1842–1925), British physician
Sir Richard Powell (civil servant), English civil servant
Richard Powell (actor, born 1896) (1896–1937), American actor 
Richard Powell (canoeist), American slalom canoeist in 2013 Canoe Slalom World Cup